Per Olof Sundman (4 September 1922, Vaxholm – 9 October 1992, Stockholm) was a Swedish writer and politician.

Sundman was born in Vaxholm. After World War II, Sundman joined the Centre Party and was elected to the Riksdag.

Per Olof Sundman released his first book in 1957 and soon became a successful writer, even internationally. His writing has been compared to that of Ernest Hemingway. In 1968, Sundman received the Nordic Council's Literature Prize for his 1967 novel Ingenjör Andrées luftfärd (The Flight of the Eagle) and in 1975, he became a member of the Swedish Academy, seat 6. His seat is now held by Tomas Riad.

References

Sources 
 Hinchliffe, Ian (1995). The documentary novel: fact, fiction, or fraud? : an examination of three Scandinavian examples of the documentary novels from the 1960s and 1970s. Boston Spa: British Library Document Supply Centre. Libris 1966896.

 McGregor, Rick (1994). Per Olof Sundman and the Icelandic sagas: a study of narrative method. Skrifter utgivna av Litteraturvetenskapliga institutionen vid Göteborgs universitet, 0348-4653 ; 26. Göteborg: Litteraturvetenskapliga institutionen, Univ. Libris 7756431. .

 Warme, Lars G. (1984). Per Olof Sundman: writer of the North. Contributions to the study of world literature, 0738-9345 ; 7. Westport, Conn.: Greenwood Press. Libris 4802505. .

1922 births
1992 deaths
People from Vaxholm Municipality
Swedish-language writers
Members of the Riksdag from the Centre Party (Sweden)
Members of the Swedish Academy
Nordic Council Literature Prize winners